Motukarara is a locality to the northeast of Lake Ellesmere / Te Waihora in the Selwyn District of New Zealand. State Highway 75 passes through the centre of the village, connecting Christchurch with Akaroa and the Banks Peninsula. The Little River Branch, which operated between 1886 and 1962, ran through Motukarara, and is now a shared walkway and cycleway.

Motukarara Racecourse is a grass harness racing track operated by the Banks Peninsula Trotting Club.

Greenpark Huts is a small village on the shore of Lake Ellesmere / Te Waihora. The land belongs to Te Rūnanga o Ngāi Tahu, which does not intend to renew leases when they expire on 30 June 2024, due to limited drinking water, poor wastewater systems and sea level rise. Residents will need to remove their huts and belongings.

Demographics 
Motukarara statistical area includes Greenpark and Greenpark Huts.

The statistical area had a population of 612 at the 2018 New Zealand census, a decrease of 81 people (-11.7%) since the 2013 census, and an increase of 24 people (4.1%) since the 2006 census. There were 234 households. There were 306 males and 303 females, giving a sex ratio of 1.01 males per female. The median age was 45.6 years (compared with 37.4 years nationally), with 102 people (16.7%) aged under 15 years, 114 (18.6%) aged 15 to 29, 321 (52.5%) aged 30 to 64, and 75 (12.3%) aged 65 or older.

Ethnicities were 94.1% European/Pākehā, 5.9% Māori, 0.5% Pacific peoples, 4.4% Asian, and 1.0% other ethnicities (totals add to more than 100% since people could identify with multiple ethnicities).

The proportion of people born overseas was 15.2%, compared with 27.1% nationally.

Although some people objected to giving their religion, 54.4% had no religion, 38.7% were Christian, 0.5% were Hindu, 1.0% were Muslim, 0.5% were Buddhist and 2.5% had other religions.

Of those at least 15 years old, 105 (20.6%) people had a bachelor or higher degree, and 90 (17.6%) people had no formal qualifications. The median income was $41,000, compared with $31,800 nationally. The employment status of those at least 15 was that 312 (61.2%) people were employed full-time, 84 (16.5%) were part-time, and 9 (1.8%) were unemployed.

References

External links

Selwyn District
Populated places in Canterbury, New Zealand